This article shows the rosters of all participating teams at the women's indoor volleyball tournament at the 2004 Summer Olympics in Athens.

Pool A

The following is the Brazilian roster in the women's volleyball tournament of the 2004 Summer Olympics.

Head coach: José Roberto Guimarães

The following is the Greek roster in the women's volleyball tournament of the 2004 Summer Olympics.

Head coach: Dimitrios Floros

The following is the Italian roster in the women's volleyball tournament of the 2004 Summer Olympics.

Head coach: Marco Bonitta

The following is the Japanese roster in the women's volleyball tournament of the 2004 Summer Olympics.

Head coach: Shoichi Yanagimoto

The following is the Kenyan roster in the women's volleyball tournament of the 2004 Summer Olympics.

Head coach: Muge Kibet

The following is the South Korean roster in the women's volleyball tournament of the 2004 Summer Olympics.

Head coach: Kim Cheol-yong

Pool B

The following is the Chinese roster in the women's volleyball tournament of the 2004 Summer Olympics.

Head coach: Chen Zhonghe

The following is the Cuban roster in the women's volleyball tournament of the 2004 Summer Olympics.

Head coach: Luis Felipe Calderón

The following is the Dominican Republic roster in the women's volleyball tournament of the 2004 Summer Olympics.

Head coach: Jorge Garbey

The following is the German roster in the women's volleyball tournament of the 2004 Summer Olympics.

Head coach: Lee Hee-wan

The following is the Russian roster in the women's volleyball tournament of the 2004 Summer Olympics.

Head coach: Nikolay Karpol

The following is the American roster in the women's volleyball tournament of the 2004 Summer Olympics.

Head coach: Toshi Yoshida

References

External links
FIVB Olympic Coverage
Official results (squads at pgs. 4-15)

2004
2
Teams
Olympics Teams
Volleyball